Mingo Wilderness is an 8,000 acre (32 km2) U.S. Wilderness Area located in southeastern Missouri in the Mingo National Wildlife Refuge. It was established and governed under the Wilderness Act of 1964. While the public is invited to engage in recreational opportunities such as fishing, hiking, canoeing, and wildlife observation, all uses are primitive and nondestructive and all access is by either foot traffic or nonmotorized boat.

A special auto tour that runs around the perimeter of the Wilderness Area is open on Saturdays and Sundays in April, October, and November.

The following specific activities are permitted in the Wilderness Area:

 Hiking and backpacking:  Most hiking is associated with and used as the means to accomplish other activities such as wildlife observation, berry picking, or fishing. There are no established hiking trails in the Wilderness Area.
 Fishing: Most fishing is done from small boats and canoes or from the bank. Fishing pressure is usually heaviest during the spring and summer months, especially on week-ends. Boat motors are prohibited in the Wilderness Area.
 Wildlife Observation: Wildlife and wild lands observation is a popular activity in the Wilderness Area. Deer, wild turkey, raccoon, migratory birds and other wildlife are readily seen in this area.
 Environmental Education and Interpretation: groups such as school and college classes are allowed to use the Wilderness area for educational purposes.

See also 
 Bell Mountain Wilderness
 Devils Backbone Wilderness
 Hercules-Glades Wilderness
 Irish Wilderness
 Paddy Creek Wilderness
 Piney Creek Wilderness
 Rockpile Mountain Wilderness
 Mingo National Wildlife Refuge

External links
 Mingo Wilderness Area

IUCN Category Ib
Protected areas of Stoddard County, Missouri
Protected areas of Wayne County, Missouri
Wilderness areas of Missouri